Pauline Perpetua Sheen  ( Quirke; born 8 July 1959) is an English actress who has played Sharon Theodopolopodous in the long-running comedy series Birds of a Feather (1988–1999, 2014–2017). For this role, she won the 1990 British Comedy Award for Best Newcomer. She was nominated for the BAFTA TV Award for Best Actress for her role in the 1996 BBC miniseries The Sculptress. Her other television credits include Maisie Raine (1998–1999), Down to Earth (2000–2003), Emmerdale (2010–2012) and Broadchurch (2013–2015).

Career

Early work
Quirke began her career as a child actress with an appearance in Dixon of Dock Green. Another early role was that of an autistic teenager in the 1975 TV drama Jenny Can't Work Any Faster.

By 1976 she had her own TV show, Pauline's Quirkes, on Thames Television, which featured pop music, teenage topics, and comedy sketches. This was also the first television show in which Quirke and Linda Robson appeared together regularly. In 1976 she played the lead role in the "Special Offer" episode of ATV's Beasts, by Nigel Kneale, also starring Wensley Pithey and Martin Shaw. Quirke also had a small role in the movie The Elephant Man in 1980. Quirke played Veronica in Shine on Harvey Moon in 1982.

Quirke's big break came in 1989, when she began playing the part of Sharon Theodopolopodous in the BBC sitcom Birds of a Feather with Linda Robson and Lesley Joseph. The series ran on the BBC from 1989 to 1998 and was resurrected on ITV between 2014 and 2017, with a final episode in December 2020 in which Quirke did not appear.

Later work
From 1994 to 1999, Quirke appeared in a series of Surf adverts with Linda Robson, and the pair worked together on the BBC documentary series Jobs for the Girls. In 1996, she starred in the BBC television adaptation of The Sculptress by Minette Walters, receiving much critical acclaim for her performance, including a British Academy TV Award nomination for Best Actress. When Birds of a Feather ended, Quirke began playing DI Maisie Raine in Maisie Raine, a drama series for BBC One, which ran in 1998 and 1999.

From 2000 to 2003, Quirke starred opposite Warren Clarke in the BBC series Down to Earth. She made a return to comedy in 2000 when she starred with Neil Stuke, Robert Daws and Pippa Haywood in BBC sitcom Office Gossip. After a start with over six million viewers, the show found its ratings dropped and it was cancelled after only one series. However, Quirke was nominated for Most Popular Comedy Performer at the National Television Awards for her role. In 2002, she starred alongside Nitin Ganatra in Being April, a comedy drama for BBC One. Quirke appeared in Carrie's War in 2004 and in 2005, played a major role in The Bill as Cath Wilson, a woman wrongly convicted of murdering a child.

In 2006, Quirke played Colleen McCabe in The Thieving Headmistress and in 2008, she appeared in an episode of My Family as Sharon the Bank Robber. Quirke has frequently been seen in the audience of Strictly Come Dancing and has appeared on its companion show It Takes Two more than once. She was a contestant on BBC's Celebrity MasterChef in June 2007, but was disqualified for creating a dish that was described by Loyd Grossman as "in no way resembling a meal".

In 2009 and 2010, she played the lead role in the BBC daytime drama series Missing as DS Mary Jane "MJ" Croft, head of a Missing Persons Unit. In May 2010, it was announced that Quirke would be joining the rural soap opera Emmerdale as Hazel Rhodes, the mother of established character, Jackson Walsh. Quirke said, "I've never done anything like this before so it's something different for me and I'm very happy to be a part of it." On 16 May 2011, it was announced that Quirke had decided to quit Emmerdale. Her character left on 25 January 2012.

From 2013 to 2015, Quirke had a recurring role as Susan Wright in ITV drama series Broadchurch, appearing in all eight episodes of the first series and returning to feature in two of the eight episodes of the second series. Her pet Labrador, Bailey, also appeared in the programme. She was a guest panellist on Loose Women on two occasions.

In 2015, she played the role of Paula Winton in the ten-part comedy thriller You, Me and the Apocalypse for Sky1.

Quirke decided not to be involved in the final episode of Birds of a Feather in December 2020, to concentrate on her Performing Arts Academies.

She was appointed Member of the Order of the British Empire (MBE) in the 2022 Birthday Honours for services to young people, the entertainment industry and charity.

Filmography

Selected stage credits

Awards and nominations

Personal life
Quirke has two children, Emily and Charlie (who stars as Travis in Birds of a Feather) and is married to producer Steve Sheen who also worked on Birds of a Feather as an executive producer from 2014 until 2017.

In 2007 The Pauline Quirke Academy of Performing Arts opened at various locations across the UK. Quirke set this up as an extracurricular centre for young people who want to learn performing arts.

References

External links
Official website
Pauline Quirke Academy of Performing Arts

Pauline Quirke at the British Film Institute
Pauline Quirke at BBC Comedy Guide
Pauline Quirke at BBC Drama Faces

Living people
English child actresses
English film actresses
English stage actresses
English soap opera actresses
English television actresses
Actresses from London
People from Hackney Central
Alumni of the Anna Scher Theatre School
20th-century English actresses
21st-century English actresses
1959 births
Members of the Order of the British Empire